Eyal may refer to:

People
Eyal Almoshnino (born 1976), Israeli footballer 
Eyal Barkan, Israeli trance producer
Eyal Ben Ami (born 1976), Israeli footballer 
Eyal Ben-Ari (born 1953), professor of anthropology 
Eyal Ben-Reuven (born 1954), Israeli major general in the Israel Defense Forces
Eyal Berkovic (born 1972), Israeli football player
Eyal Eisenberg (born 1963), general in the Israel Defense Forces 
Eyal Golan, (born 1971), Israeli singer
Eyal Golasa, (born 1991), Israeli footballer 
Eyal Gordin, American cinematographer and television director  
Eyal Hertzog (born 1974), co-founder and CCO of video-sharing website Metacafe Hertzog 
Eyal Kitzis (born 1969), Israeli actor, comedian, and TV host
Eyal Lahman (born 1965), Israeli football manager 
Eyal Levi, (born 1979), American guitarist and song co-writer
Eyal Levin (born 1986), Israeli Olympic sports sailor
Eyal Maoz (born 1969), Israeli-born American guitarist, bandleader, and solo performer 
Eyal Meshumar (born 1983),Israeli footballer 
Eyal Podell (born 1976), Israeli-born American actor
Eyal Ran (born 1972), Israeli tennis player and Captain of the Israeli Davis Cup team
Eyal Shulman (born 1987), Israeli basketball player
Eyal Stigman (born 1963), Israeli Olympic swimmer
Eyal Tartazky (born 1977), Israeli footballer 
Eyal Weizman (born 1970), Israeli intellectual and architect
Eyal Yaffe (born 1960), Israeli basketball player
 Eyal Yifrah, 19-year-old killed in the 2014 kidnapping and murder of Israeli teenagers

Surname
Nir Eyal (born 1980), behavioral engineer, author of Hooked: How to Build Habit-Forming Products
Nir Eyal (bioethicist) (born 1970) - Rutgers bioethicist
Sharon Eyal (born 1971), Israeli ballet dancer and choreographer
Shlomi Eyal (born 1959), Israeli fencer

Kibbutzim
Eyal, an Israeli kibbutz